Merga may refer to:

38 Boötis, a star in the constellation Boötes also known as Merga
Prototheora merga, a species of moth of the family Prototheoridae
Pesh merga, term used by Kurds to refer to armed Kurdish fighters
Merga Bien (late 1560s – 1603), German woman convicted of witchcraft and killed

Ethiopian name
Merga (Amharic: መርጋ) is a male name of Ethiopian origin
Deriba Merga (born 1980), Ethiopian long-distance runner and 2009 Boston Marathon winner
Imane Merga (born 1988), Ethiopian long-distance runner and cross country world champion

Amharic-language names